Christ Church, Wharton, is in the town of Winsford, Cheshire, England. It is an active evangelical Anglican parish church in the diocese of Chester, the archdeaconry of Chester and the deanery of Middlewich.

History
Christ Church, Wharton, traces its origins to an unconsecrated chapel of ease built c.1835 at the instigation of John Furnival, a curate of Davenham. This was the first Anglican religious building in Wharton, and was built to be a challenge to the growth of Methodism in the district.
The chapel was located at Wharton Bridges. Its exact location is unknown, but Wharton Bridges was the original name of the road bridge on Wharton Road, crossing the London and North Western Railway.

When the parish of Wharton was created in 1843, initially as a district of Davenham parish (it was not until 10 March 1860 that Wharton became a separate ecclesiastical parish), the Wharton Bridges chapel was replaced by a new chapel of ease. It was built by James France-France, of Bostock Hall, Bostock, on Crook Lane, at its junction with School Road. The new chapel, called Christ's Church, was consecrated on 26 June 1843 by the Bishop of Chester, John Bird Sumner. A vicarage was built in 1848, formed from two cottages, at a cost of £673 14s.

During the 1840s the population of Wharton increased by approximately 27 per cent, from 1,400 persons in 1841 to 1,775 persons in 1851, and Christ's Church chapel of ease was soon considered too small for the parish. With money raised from public subscription, including gifts from Princess Victoria of Saxe-Coburg-Saalfeld the queen mother (mother of Queen Victoria), John Bird Sumner (the newly appointed Archbishop of Canterbury)  and grants from the Church Building Societies, the chapel was substantially enlarged with a nave, chancel and bell tower. The old chapel of ease became the north and south transepts of the new building (called Christ Church), which provided seating on benches for 350 persons. The cost of the rebuilding was £1,574 10s 7d, and the church was consecrated on 20 December 1849 by the Bishop of Chester, John Graham.

In 1913 the chancel was extended, and the church was reconsecrated on 18 October 1913 by the Bishop of Chester, Francis Jayne.

Present day
Two services are held on Sundays, a morning service and an afternoon service, and a Communion service is held each Wednesday morning. The church employs a children's worker and a youth worker, and supports missionary groups Open Doors, Gideons International, and AICMAR (African Institute for Contemporary Mission and Research).

Christ Church is within the Conservative Evangelical tradition of the Church of England. As a parish that rejects the leadership/ordination of women, it receives alternative episcopal oversight from the Bishop of Maidstone (currently Rod Thomas).

Structure
The church is built in brick with a red sandstone facing and  a slate roof.  It is a small cruciform ("cross-shaped") building in the
Gothic Revival (Perpendicular) style of Christian church architecture. At the north-west is a square bell tower, originally surmounted with four slender pinnacles (removed at some time between 1874 and 1892). The main entrance to the building is at the foot of the tower. A single bell was installed in the bell tower in the 1849 scheme, but was replaced with a peal of eight tubular bells in 1897, the gift of Mrs Lea of Winsford Lodge, Wharton, in honour of Queen Victoria's Diamond Jubilee. The tower clock, made by the Shropshire company of JB Joyce & Co at a cost of £50 and installed in 1849, was the gift of saltworks proprietor John Dudley of Wharton Lodge, in memory of his wife, Elizabeth (a Latin inscription on the clock face records the gift).

Fittings and furnishings
The church has a number of memorial windows in stained glass, most notable of which are the east window (to Revd John Lothian, died 1859 after being thrown from his horse), and the west window (to Revd John Samuel Bage, died 1873). The north and south transepts contain large metal panels overpainted with the Lord's Prayer, the Creed, and the Ten Commandments. The painting is in the Gothic Revival style, and the panels are probably contemporary with the building of the church. The church has had three organs. The first, installed in 1849, was replaced by the second organ, c.1874. This was replaced in 1920 by the present organ, the gift of Mrs Marion Newell in memory of her son, Sub-Lt Jack H.M. Newall, killed in action 13 November 1916, on the outskirts of Beaucourt-sur-l'Ancre, France, during the Battle of the Ancre. His medals are on display next to the organ. At the west end of the nave is a Commonwealth War Graves Commission headstone to Senior Aircraftsman Ian Shinner, killed in a Provisional Irish Republican Army (IRA) shooting at Roermond, the Netherlands, on May 2, 1988. The interior was lit by gas until electric lights were installed in 1937.

External features
On the approach to the main entrance is a war memorial, an oak crucifix on a stone base erected in 1920 at a cost of £280. It records the names of 78 Wharton parishioners killed in action during World War I.  The churchyard contains the war graves of five service personnel of World War I, and four of World War II.

Clergy in the parish of Christ Church, Wharton

Notes and references

Church of England church buildings in Cheshire
Diocese of Chester
Gothic Revival church buildings in England
Gothic Revival architecture in Cheshire
Wharton
Winsford